Kids' Lives Matter (lit. Doctors Under The Stars) is a Hong Kong medical television series created and produced by television network TVB. Directed by Ben Fong, it premiered on 18 October 2021 and continued until 22 November 2021 for 25 episodes.  With pediatric surgery as the backdrop and a cast starring Kevin Cheng, Kenneth Ma, Linda Chung, and Catherine Chau, the show chronicles the lives of the medical interns, residents, and attendings working and healing the sick children at the fictional Princess Anne Hospital.

Cast

 Kevin Cheng as Dr. Johnathan Hui Gam-fung – pediatric surgeon and Consultant doctor
 Kenneth Ma as Dr. Amos Fong Chung-yan – pediatric surgeon and Consultant doctor
 Linda Chung as Dr. Eman Cheung Yi-sum – pediatric cardiothoracic surgeon
 Catherine Chau as Dr. Kay Mak Hoi-kei – chief of service of pediatric department
 Him Law as Dr. Max Man Pak-hei – pediatric resident specialist
 Mimi Kung as Dr. Flora Chung Wai-seung – Dean of School of Medicine
 Bowie Cheung as Dr. Candice Lin Cheuk-ying – anesthetic medical intern
 Regina Ho as Dr. Esther Yu Chi-wa – pediatric medical intern
 Gabriel Harrison as Dr. Paul Chow Chun-yiu – Hospital Chief Executive
 Florence Kwok as Dr. Joey Kwok Bo-ying – anesthesiologist

Plot

The story begins with a flashback in 2001 introducing Johnathan Hui, Amos Fong, and Eman Cheung as medical interns. An operation causes a rift between Hui and Fong, leading to them becoming estranged. Flash to the present, Hui and Fong are pediatric surgeons and work at North West Hospital and Princess Anne Hospital, respectively. One day, Hui asks Fong to perform a liver transplant operation jointly. An anesthetic mistake occurs during the procedure where Cheung, a cardiothoracic surgeon, appears timely to rescue. She returns to Hong Kong after being a Doctor Without Borders and is now a newly contracted doctor at Princess Anne Hospital. With the ambitious vision of building a pediatric facility, Fong uses tactics to make Hui join Princess Anne Hospital. He then recruits Hui, Cheung, and a few other doctors, including Max Man, a resident specialist, Kay Mak, pediatric chief of service and Fong's love–interest, and Joey Kwok, an anesthesiologist, to create an "elite" surgery team, building themselves an influential reputation to pave the way for Fong's vision. The team faces various obstacles during the process, with Hui and Fong reconciling their friendship. The truth of the operation incident in the past also gets revealed. Although Fong's vision is not yet realized towards the end of the series; the doctors experience growth in both their personal and professional lives.

Production and background
The television series was directed by Ben Fong and is the first TVB's to use pediatric surgery as the main theme.  The crew was assisted by a group of professional doctors in executing the technical aspect of the filming scenes. The set for the fictional Princess Anne Hospital was built based on Hong Kong Children's Hospital. Principal photography took place in August–December 2020. It was Linda Chung's first television series after six years away from the entertainment industry.

Music 
The soundtrack consists of 4 individually released singles as follows:

Reception and ratings

Kids' Lives Matter garnered mainly positive reviews from the audience and media, who commented on the show's "convincing" acting and "moving" storyline. Lam Seun-ging from HK01, on the one hand, criticized the series's overall storyline direction for being old-fashioned but nevertheless indicated "the compactness of the script, the richness of the story's content, and the actors' performance set the show as a TVB's masterpiece in recent years and a classic among medical dramas".
An editor from Hong Kong Economic Times praised Linda Chung's maturity in her acting skills and wrote that she could fully "express the tenderness of maternal love when interacting with sick children". Although Chung did not win in the end, she was noted by the media to be among viewers' favorites for the "Best Actress" title at the 54th TVB Anniversary Awards.

Awards and nominations

Overseas Release

Singapore Broadcast 
This series will air on Mediacorp Channel 8 from 13 June 2022 on weekdays from 9:00pm to 10:00pm after succeeding The Unbreakable Bond. However, due to broadcasting laws, this series was broadcast in Mandarin-dubbed instead. Original Cantonese language of the series will be available on Mediacorp OTT service MeWATCH. It is succeeded by Your World In Mine.

Malaysia Broadcast 
This series will air on 8TV from 6 October 2022 on weekdays from 7:00pm to 7:58pm after succeeding The Line Watchers. This series will be broadcast in its original Cantonese language. It is succeeded by Take Two

Notes

References

External links
 

2021 Hong Kong television series debuts
Hong Kong drama television series
Hong Kong romance television series
TVB dramas
TVB original programming